Trevon is a given name. Notable people with the given name include:

Trevon Allen (born 1998), American basketball player
Trevon Bluiett (born 1994), American basketball player
Trevon Coley (born 1994), American football player
Trevon Diggs (born 1998), American football player
Trevon Duval (born 1998), American basketball player
Trevon Garraway (born 1984), Guyanese cricketer
Trevon Griffith (born 1991), Guyanese cricketer
Trevon Grimes (born 1998), American football player
Trevon Hartfield (born 1991), American football player
Trévon Hughes (born 1987), American basketball player
Trevon Jenifer (born 1988), American Paralympic basketball player
Trevon Logan, American economist
Trevon Moehrig (born 1999), American football player
Trevon Salazar (born 1991), Belizean racing cyclist
Trevon Scott (born 1996), American basketball player
Trevon Tate (born 1996), American football player
Trevon Wesco (born 1996), American football player
Trevon Young (born 1995), American football player

See also
Tre'Von Johnson (born 1995), American football player
Treveon, a page for people with the given name "Treveon"
Travon, a page for people with the given name "Travon"
Trayvon, a page for people with the given name "Trayvon"